Utgard is a vendor-independent Java OPC client API that supports the OPC interface and can be used independently from other Eclipse SCADA projects. Utgard is used in Eclipse SCADA together with Atlantis to connect to and communicate with systems of other vendors over the OPC DA 2.0 interface. The project is open source, written in pure Java and is distributed under the LGPL. To run Utgard, the prerequisites are a Java 1.6+ environment. In other words, with Utgard, it is possible to communicate over the OPC interface in an OS-independent manner without needing additional DLLs/shared libraries, or JNI libraries. Currently, an OPC server is required to communicate with Utgard.

References

Java APIs
Free software